The Latin Grammy Award for Best New Artist is an honor presented annually at the Latin Grammy Awards, a ceremony that recognizes excellence and creates a wider awareness of cultural diversity and contributions of Latin recording artists, nationally and internationally. The award is given to solo artists or groups that first establish an identity to the public as a performer and release a Spanish or Portuguese language recording during the period of eligibility. In 2012, the Academy announced the category (in addition to Album of the Year, Record of the Year and Song of the Year) would include ten nominees to reflect changes within the music industry.

The award for Best New Artist was first presented to the Cuban performer Ibrahim Ferrer in 2000. Benefiting from the release of the documentary Buena Vista Social Club, which launched him to stardom, Ferrer received the award at age seventy-three after being a performer for sixty years. The next three award recipients were Juanes, Jorge Moreno, and David Bisbal. In 2004, Brazilian singer Maria Rita became the first female winner. Spanish singer-songwriter Bebe announced her retirement one year after receiving the 2005 award; however, she returned to the music business five years later with the release of her second album, Y. The bands Calle 13 and Jesse & Joy won the next two awards, followed by singers Kany García, Alexander Acha, Alex Cuba, Sie7e, Mexican DJs 3Ball MTY, Gaby Moreno, Mariana Vega, Manuel Medrano, Vicente García, Karol G, Nella and Mike Bahía. Spanish singer Rosalía became the first artist to be nominated for the award, in 2017, and also the Grammy Award for Best New Artist in 2020.

The award has been presented to ten male and ten female artists; 3Ball MTY, Calle 13, Jesse & Joy and Monsieur Periné are the only ensembles to earn the award. Since its inception, the award has been presented to musicians or groups originating from Brazil, Colombia, Cuba, Mexico, Puerto Rico, the Dominican Republic, Spain and Venezuela.

Recipients

2000s

2010s

2020s

 Each year is linked to the article about the Latin Grammy Awards held that year.

See also
Grammy Award for Best New Artist
Lo Nuestro Award for New Artist of the Year

References

General
  Note: User must select the "General Field" category as the genre under the search feature.

Specific

External links
Official site of the Latin Grammy Awards

 
Music awards for breakthrough artist
New Artist
Awards established in 2000
2000 establishments in the United States